Rosberg is a Swedish surname.

It may refer to:

 Rosberg racing family
 Keke Rosberg, father of Nico, former Finnish Formula One racing driver and 1982 World Champion
 Nico Rosberg, son of Keke, former German Formula One racing driver and 2016 World Champion
 Rosberg X Racing, Extreme E team formed b Nico Rosberg
 Christer Rosberg, Swedish soccer player
 Marit Røsberg Jacobsen (born 1994) Norwegian handball player

References

See also
 Team Rosberg, a racing team owned by the Rosberg racing family

Surnames of Swedish origin